January 9 - Eastern Orthodox liturgical calendar - January 11

All fixed commemorations below are observed on January 23 by Eastern Orthodox Churches on the Old Calendar.

For January 10th, Orthodox Churches on the Old Calendar commemorate the Saints listed on December 28.

Feasts
 Afterfeast of the Theophany of Our Lord and Savior Jesus Christ.

Saints
 Blessed Theosebia the Deaconess (385), sister of Sts. Macrina, Basil the Great, Peter of Sebaste, and Gregory of Nyssa (385)
 Saint Gregory of Nyssa, Bishop (395)
 Venerable Ammon, monk, at Scetis in Egypt (5th century)
 Saint Marcian of Constantinople, Presbyter (471)
 Venerable Domitian of Melitene, Bishop of Melitene and Wonderworker (601)

Pre-Schism Western saints
 Saint Pétrone (Petronius), monk at Lérins Abbey, then Bishop of Die in France (463)
 Saint Diarmaid the Just (Dermot, Diarmis), spiritual father of St Kieran of Clonmacnois and later founder of a monastery on Innis-Clotran Island, Ireland (6th century)
 Saint Tómméne (Thomian, Toimen), Archbishop of Armagh in Ireland (c. 660)
 Saint Sæthryth (Sethrid), Abbess (c. 660)
 Saint John Camillus the Good, Bishop of Milan, he worked against Arianism and Monothelitism (669)
 Saint Agatho, Pope of Rome (681)
 Saint Peter Urseolus (Pietro I Orseolo), Doge of Venice, later became a monk at the Monastery of Cuxa in Spain (987)

Post-Schism Orthodox saints
 Venerable Paul of Obnora in Vologda, Abbot (1429)
 Saint Macarius of Obnora in Vologda, disciple of Paul of Obnora, Abbot of Pisma Monastery (15th century)
 Monk-martyr Ephraim, Elder of Obnora, and six monks of Obnora whose relics are incorrupt (1538)
 Venerable Antipas of Calapodeşti (Romania), of Mount Athos and of Valaam Monastery, Hiero-Schemamonk  (1882)
 Venerable Theophan the Recluse, Bishop of Tambov (1894)

New martyrs and confessors
 New Hieromartyr Zenobius Sutormin, Priest (1920)
 New Hieromartyr Peter Uspensky, Archpriest of Radushino (Zaraisk) (1930)
 New Hieromartyr Anatolius (Grisyuk), Metropolitan of Odessa (1938)
 New Martyr Arsenia (Dobronravova), Abbess of the Holy Resurrection-St. Theodore Convent (Shuisk) (1939)

Icon gallery

Notes

References

Sources
 January 10/January 23. Orthodox Calendar (PRAVOSLAVIE.RU).
 January 23 / January 10. HOLY TRINITY RUSSIAN ORTHODOX CHURCH (A parish of the Patriarchate of Moscow).
 January 10. OCA - The Lives of the Saints.
 The Autonomous Orthodox Metropolia of Western Europe and the Americas (ROCOR). St. Hilarion Calendar of Saints for the year of our Lord 2004. St. Hilarion Press (Austin, TX). p. 6.
 January 10. Latin Saints of the Orthodox Patriarchate of Rome.
 The Roman Martyrology. Transl. by the Archbishop of Baltimore. Last Edition, According to the Copy Printed at Rome in 1914. Revised Edition, with the Imprimatur of His Eminence Cardinal Gibbons. Baltimore: John Murphy Company, 1916. p. 11.
Greek Sources
 Great Synaxaristes:  10 ΙΑΝΟΥΑΡΙΟΥ. ΜΕΓΑΣ ΣΥΝΑΞΑΡΙΣΤΗΣ.
  Συναξαριστής. 10 Ιανουαρίου. ECCLESIA.GR. (H ΕΚΚΛΗΣΙΑ ΤΗΣ ΕΛΛΑΔΟΣ). 
Russian Sources
  23 января (10 января). Православная Энциклопедия под редакцией Патриарха Московского и всея Руси Кирилла (электронная версия). (Orthodox Encyclopedia - Pravenc.ru).
  10 января (ст.ст.) 23 января 2013 (нов. ст.). Русская Православная Церковь Отдел внешних церковных связей. (DECR).

January in the Eastern Orthodox calendar